Robert Smith (born December 22, 1992) is an American football safety who is currently a free agent. He played college football for the Clemson Tigers.

Early years
Smith attended Woodland high school in Dorchester, South Carolina where he graduated in 2011.

College career
Smith committed to Clemson on January 15, 2010 and enrolled in July 2011. Smith was enrolled at Clemson from 2011 to 2014 and played all four years for Dabo Swinney's Tigers, playing in 53 games over that span.

Professional career

Indianapolis Colts
On May 4, 2015, after going undrafted, Smith was signed by the Indianapolis Colts. On August 6, 2015 Smith was waived by the Colts to make room for Tevin Mitchel.

Seattle Seahawks
On August 7, 2015, the Seattle Seahawks signed Smith off of waivers. Two days later, on August 9, Smith was waived by the Seahawks due to a failed physical. On January 18, 2016 Smith signed a futures contract with the Seahawks.

Personal life
On December 18, 2014 Smith graduated from Clemson with a degree in health science.

References

External links
Seattle Seahawks bio
Indianapolis Colts bio
Clemson Tigers bio

1992 births
Living people
American football safeties
Clemson Tigers football players
Indianapolis Colts players
Seattle Seahawks players
People from St. George, South Carolina
Players of American football from South Carolina